Gobé Gouano (born 10 December 2000) is a French professional footballer who plays as a midfielder.

Club career

Monaco
Gouano made his professional debut on 6 November 2018 in the UEFA Champions League group stage against Club Brugge. He replaced Radamel Falcao after 61 minutes in a 4–0 home loss.

Aarau
On 2 September 2021, he signed a contract with Aarau in Switzerland until the end of 2021. The contract was not extended beyond the original expiration date.

International career
Born in France, Gouano is of Ivorian descent. He is a youth international for France.

Career statistics

Club

References

External links

AS Monaco profile

2000 births
People from Ivry-sur-Seine
Footballers from Val-de-Marne
French sportspeople of Ivorian descent
Living people
French footballers
France youth international footballers
Association football forwards
AS Monaco FC players
FC Aarau players
Championnat National 2 players
Swiss Challenge League players
French expatriate footballers
Expatriate footballers in Switzerland
French expatriate sportspeople in Switzerland